Borislav Aleksandrov Tsonev (born on 29 April 1995) is a Bulgarian professional footballer who plays as a midfielder for Chinese Super League club Dalian Professional. He is a twin brother of Radoslav Tsonev.

Career
Born in Blagoevgrad, Tsonev began playing football for local side Pirin. In 2009, he joined Levski Sofia's academy.

Borislav made his first team debut in a 3–0 league win over Montana on 27 May 2011, coming on as a substitute for Vladimir Gadzhev. On 29 April 2013, he signed his first professional contract with the club on his 18th birthday.

Tsonev scored his first goal for Levski on 18 September 2013, in a 4–0 win over Pirin Gotse Delchev in the first round of the Bulgarian Cup. In the second leg against Pirin on 12 October he made his first start for Levski. On 26 October, Tsonev made his first league start in a 1–0 home win over Botev Plovdiv, but was sent-off after 68 minutes.

On 11 October 2016, Tsonev signed a contract with Beroe Stara Zagora. On 25 November 2018, He scored a hat-trick in a 6–0 home win against Vereya.

In 2020, Tsonev, along with his twin brother Radoslav, returned to Levski Sofia. The two brothers immediately became the leaders of Levski on the pitch. Despite being simultaneously injured for a prolonged period, they gained somewhat of a cult status among fans due to their loyalty to the club at a time of financial hardship.

After joining Ukrainian club Chornomorets Odesa on a two-and-a-half year contract in January 2022, he was forced to seek another team following the 2022 Russian invasion of Ukraine. In February 2022 he was loaned out to Slavia Sofia for three months.

On 21 August 2022, Tsonev joined Chinese club Dalian Professional on a free transfer.

International career
Tsonev received his first call-up for the senior Bulgarian squad on 29 August 2018 for the UEFA Nations League matches against Slovenia and Norway on 6 and 9 September. He earned his first cap three years later - on 8 September 2021, appearing as a starter in the 4–1 win over Georgia in a friendly match.

Career statistics

References

External links
 
 Profile at LevskiSofia.info

1995 births
Living people
Bulgarian footballers
Bulgaria youth international footballers
Bulgaria international footballers
Association football midfielders
First Professional Football League (Bulgaria) players
Croatian Football League players
Chinese Super League players
PFC Levski Sofia players
PFC Beroe Stara Zagora players
NK Inter Zaprešić players
PFC Slavia Sofia players
FC Chornomorets Odesa players
Dalian Professional F.C. players
Bulgarian twins
Twin sportspeople
Sportspeople from Blagoevgrad
Bulgarian expatriate footballers
Expatriate footballers in Croatia
Bulgarian expatriate sportspeople in Croatia
Expatriate footballers in Ukraine
Bulgarian expatriate sportspeople in Ukraine
Expatriate footballers in China
Bulgarian expatriate sportspeople in China